D20 is a state road in Međimurje and Podravina regions of Croatia connecting Koprivnica to the D3 state road near Čakovec, and the road also serves as a connecting road to the A4 motorway as it forms a junction with the A4 Čakovec interchange.

The road, as well as all other state roads in Croatia, is managed and maintained by Hrvatske ceste, state owned company.

Traffic volume 

Traffic is regularly counted and reported by Hrvatske ceste, operator of the road.

Road junctions and populated areas

Maps

Sources

D020
D020
D020